Herniaria lusitanica subsp. berlengiana is an endangered subspecies of flowering plant in the family Caryophyllaceae. It is endemic to the Berlengas Archipelago, Portugal.

Description
Herniaria lusitanica subsp. berlengiana is a biennal or perennial plant much smaller than its mainland counterpart (subsp. lusitanica). Glomeruli have 4-7(10) flowers, .

Distribution and habitat
The plant has thin herbaceous communities growing mainly in arid sites, skeletal soils and in fissures of granite rocks as well as along hiking trails.

Threats
It is mainly threatened by invasive plant species, namely the sour fig (Carpobrotus edulis), and clearing of hiking paths. Trampling is actually beneficial for this plant as it reduces its competition by keeping surrounding vegetation low.

References

lusitanica subsp. berlengiana
Endemic flora of Portugal